The Robert Buckles Barn is a round barn located  southeast of Mount Pulaski, Illinois, United States. The barn was built in 1917 on the Buckles family farm. It is one of the only surviving round barns in central Illinois and one of only two known in the state built with vitrified tile. The tile is specially curved to fit the barn's exterior based on its  radius. The barn's design, like that of most Illinois round barns, was inspired by a promotional effort by the University of Illinois' Agricultural Experiment Station which spurred the round barn movement in the state.

The barn was added to the National Register of Historic Places on February 10, 1983.

References

Barns on the National Register of Historic Places in Illinois
Buildings and structures completed in 1917
Buildings and structures in Logan County, Illinois
Round barns in Illinois
National Register of Historic Places in Logan County, Illinois